Doriclea may refer to:

La Doriclea (Cavalli)
La Doriclea (Stradella)